P. maximus  may refer to:
 Paralongidorus maximus, a plant pathogenic nematode species
 Pecari maximus, the giant peccary, a possible fourth species of peccary, discovered in Brazil
 Pecten maximus, the great scallop or king scallop, an edible saltwater clam species
 Physalaemus maximus, a frog species endemic to Brazil
 Prosaurolophus maximus, a hadrosaurid dinosaur species from the Late Cretaceous of North America
 P maximus, a former alias of one Phineas D.M, music producer, writer, singer, pianist and master beat writer.

See also
 Maximus (disambiguation)